William Henry Wallace (March 24, 1827 – March 21, 1901) was a Confederate States Army brigadier general during the American Civil War (Civil War). Before the Civil War, he was a planter, newspaper publisher, lawyer and South Carolina legislator in 1860 who supported the state calling a secession convention. He served in the Eastern Theater of the American Civil War, including service as a brigade commander in the Army of Northern Virginia. After the Civil War, he was a lawyer, planter, South Carolina legislator and circuit judge.

Early life
Son of Congressman Daniel Wallace, William Henry Wallace was born March 24, 1827 in Laurens County, South Carolina, then the Laurens District. He graduated from South Carolina College, which became the University of South Carolina, in 1849. Before the Civil War, he was a planter, publisher of the Union Times newspaper (Union, South Carolina), lawyer and South Carolina legislator.  As a member of the South Carolina legislature in 1860, Wallace supported the state calling a convention for the purpose of deciding the issue of secession.  Wallace married Sarah Smith Dunlap, the great granddaughter of United States Senator John Hunter (South Carolina politician).  Wallace's son-in-law was John Calhoun Sheppard the 82nd Governor of South Carolina.

American Civil War service
When Wallace completed his term in the South Carolina state legislature, he enlisted as a private in the 18th South Carolina Infantry Regiment. He was soon regimental adjutant and was elected first lieutenant and captain in January 1862. In May 1862, he was elected lieutenant colonel. The regiment was stationed in South Carolina until July 1862.

When the colonel of the regiment was killed during the Second Bull Run Campaign on August 30, 1862, Wallace succeeded to command of the regiment to rank from that date as colonel. He was not formally nominated for the appointment until June 10, 1864.

In the brigade of Brigadier General Nathan G. "Shanks" Evans, Wallace commanded his regiment at the Battle of South Mountain and the Battle of Antietam. The brigade then went to defend Charleston, South Carolina. 

In the Spring of 1864, the brigade, then commanded by Brigadier General Stephen Elliott, Jr. was ordered to the defense of Petersburg, Virginia. The 18th South Carolina Infantry was holding part of the line under which the Union Army explosive charges were detonated which led to the Battle of the Crater on July 30, 1864. The mine explosion blew up four companies of the 18th South Carolina Infantry and injured Elliott.

William Henry Wallace was promoted to brigadier general, under the Confederate law permitting the Confederate President to appoint twenty temporary brigadier generals on September 20, 1864. Elliott had been incapacitated by the mine explosion so Wallace commanded his former brigade in Major General Bushrod Johnson's division, IV Corp, until the surrender of the Army of Northern Virginia on April 9, 1865 at Appomattox Court House, Virginia. Wallace was paroled at Appomattox Court House on that date.

Aftermath
After the Civil War, Wallace returned to South Carolina where he was a lawyer and planter. He was elected to the South Carolina legislature for three two-year terms starting with the 1872 election. Wallace was a circuit judge from 1877 until he retired in 1893.

William Henry Wallace died on March 21, 1901 at Union, South Carolina. He is buried in Presbyterian Cemetery at Union.

See also

List of American Civil War generals (Confederate)

Notes

References
 Boatner, Mark Mayo, III. The Civil War Dictionary. New York: McKay, 1988. . First published 1959 by McKay.
 Eicher, John H., and David J. Eicher, Civil War High Commands. Stanford: Stanford University Press, 2001. .
 Sifakis, Stewart. Who Was Who in the Civil War. New York: Facts On File, 1988. .
 Warner, Ezra J. Generals in Gray: Lives of the Confederate Commanders. Baton Rouge: Louisiana State University Press, 1959. .
 Wert, Jeffry D. "Wallace, William Henry" in Historical Times Illustrated History of the Civil War, edited by Patricia L. Faust. New York: Harper & Row, 1986. .

1827 births
1901 deaths
Confederate States Army generals
People of South Carolina in the American Civil War